Falcatifolium angustum is a species of conifer in the family Podocarpaceae found only in Malaysia.
it can grow up to twenty meters tall. It is threatened by habitat loss, in 1998 it was known to exist only in two locations, both in Sarawak.

References

Podocarpaceae
Vulnerable plants
Taxonomy articles created by Polbot
Taxa named by David John de Laubenfels